Cooper Creek is a stream in the U.S. state of Georgia. It is a tributary to the Toccoa River.

Cooper Creek was named after Joseph and William Cooper, pioneer citizens.

References

Rivers of Georgia (U.S. state)
Rivers of Fannin County, Georgia
Rivers of Union County, Georgia